Philip "Philly" McMahon (born 5 September 1987) is a Gaelic footballer who plays for the Ballymun Kickhams club and for the Dublin county team.

Playing career

Club
McMahon is a member of the Ballymun Kickhams Senior Football team. in 2013, Ballymun reached the 2012–13 All-Ireland Senior Club Football Championship final. McMahon scored a goal as Ballymun were defeated by St. Brigid's of County Roscommon by a single point, on a scoreline of 2-11 to 2-10.

Inter-county
McMahon won the 2008 O'Byrne Cup with Dublin, defeating Longford in the final. He made his Championship debut that year as a sub against Louth. He played Interprovincial Championship Football for Leinster and won 2 Dublin Under 21 Football Championships with Ballymun. He was named on the 2010 GPA Gaelic Team of the Year. He replaced James McCarthy as a sub in the second half of the 2011 All-Ireland Senior Football Championship Final, a game which Dublin won by 1-12 to 1-11 against Kerry.

On 22 September 2013, McMahon made his first start of the Championship in the All Ireland Final. He was a key performer in Dublin's defeat of Mayo on a scoreline of 2-12 to 1-14.

McMahon helped Dublin to win the 2015 All Ireland final. Throughout the season he became a strong attacking threat despite being named at left corner back. He scored 1-02 in the replayed semi final against Mayo, notably holding Aidan O'Shea to a single point in over both games. McMahon was a key performer in the final where Dublin defeated reigning champions Kerry 0-12 to 0-09, with McMahon scoring a point in the 1st half while keeping marker Colm Cooper scoreless. McMahon received his first All Star award while he was also named on the shortlist for GAA Footballer of the Year, ultimately won by teammate Jack McCaffrey.

McMahon was again a key performer in 2016 as Dublin again defeated Mayo by a single point after a replay on a scoreline of 1-15 to 1-14 to retain the Sam Maguire Cup. McMahon received his second All Star for his performances.

In 2017 Dublin were narrowly defeated in the National League final by Kerry by a single point. They then went on to win a record 7 Leinster titles in a row. On 17 September, McMahon was heavily involved as Dublin claim a historic 3 in a row All Ireland titles with another narrow 1-17 to 1-16 victory against Mayo. Having been outplayed in the first half, the Dubs turned the game around to win a thrilling game courtesy of a 75th minute Dean Rock free.

McMahon announced his retirement from inter-county football on 17 December 2021.

International rules
McMahon made his debut in the 2015 International Rules Series. Ireland edged out the single game series against a strong Australia side on a scoreline of 56-52.

Work with association football clubs
In November 2012, McMahon was the strength and conditioning coach at Shamrock Rovers.

In May 2021, McMahon began working with the Bohemians club's first team as a performance coach.

Personal life
McMahon changed his surname from Caffrey, his mother's name, to McMahon, his father's name, whom he was named after. His father died from cancer at the age of 64 in 2018.

McMahon is a business owner and operates multiple gyms. He also launched a health food company. He is a saxophonist.

In 2017, after winning his fifth All-Ireland Senior Championship, McMahon released his autobiography called The Choice, which was co-written by sports journalist Niall Kelly. The book won the 2017 Eir Sports Book of the Year award in December 2017. The book also won the Sports Book of the Year award at the 2017 Irish Book Awards.

He married his long-term girlfriend Sarah Lacey in December 2019.

McMahon's brother died in 2012 from a drug overdose, and McMahon has spoken about the effects of drugs in his community. He has spoken in support of safe injection centres, and criticised Fine Gael TD Paul Kehoe in 2022 for his usage of the term "druggies".

He has set up a charity called Half Time Talk, which aims to motivate young adults with social problems. He has been involved with charity fundraising, such as the Focus Ireland "Shine A Light Night" to raise money for homeless families.

Ever the glutton for punishment. Philly supports Everton.

Honours

Team

Dublin
All-Ireland Senior Football Championship (8): 2011, 2013, 2015, 2016, 2017, 2018, 2019, 2020
Leinster Senior Football Championship (12): 2009, 2011, 2012, 2013, 2014, 2015, 2016, 2017, 2018, 2019, 2020, 2021
 National Football League (5): 2013, 2014, 2015, 2016, 2018
 O'Byrne Cup (1): 2008

Ballymun Kickhams
Leinster Senior Club Football Championship (1): 2012-13
Dublin Senior Football Championship (2): 2012, 2020

Ireland
International Rules Series (1): 2015

DCU
Sigerson Cup (2): 2010, 2012

Individual
 All Star Awards (2): 2015, 2016

References

1987 births
Living people
Ballymun Kickhams Gaelic footballers
Bohemian F.C.
DCU Gaelic footballers
Dublin inter-county Gaelic footballers
Gaelic football backs
Shamrock Rovers F.C.
Strength and conditioning coaches
Winners of eight All-Ireland medals (Gaelic football)